"C-lebrity" is a song by Queen + Paul Rodgers, released as the second single from the album The Cosmos Rocks. The song reached No. 1 on the UK Rock Singles Chart.

Overview
The song was released on September 8, 2008 and was available on CD, 7" vinyl and digital downloadable formats.

On August 4, 2008 the track was premiered for the first time on Ken Bruce's radio show on BBC Radio 2.

It received its live debut on the series finale of ITV's Al Murray's Happy Hour.

Taylor Hawkins of Foo Fighters sang backing vocals. Brian May plays bass guitar on the track.

The song was released as downloadable content as part of a Queen Track Pack for Guitar Hero: World Tour on March 26, 2009.

Composition
The song tells the story from the point of view of an aspiring celebrity, who does not let their apparent lack of talent hold them back.

The song's main riff bears a strong resemblance to that of the 1990 Judas Priest song "A Touch of Evil".

Queen + Paul Rodgers on the single

Track listing
All songs written by Queen + Paul Rodgers except where noted
7"
"C-lebrity" – 3:38
"Fire and Water (Live in Japan)" (Rodgers, Andy Fraser) – 3:46

CD
"C-lebrity" – 3:38
"C-lebrity" (Video)

Maxi CD
"C-lebrity" – 3:38
"Say It's Not True" – 4:01
"Tie Your Mother Down (Live in Sheffield)" (Brian May) – 4:30
"C-lebrity" (Video)
"Say It's Not True" (Video)

Chart positions

References

External links
 
 Lyrics at Queen official website

2008 songs
2008 singles
Queen + Paul Rodgers songs
Songs written by Roger Taylor (Queen drummer)
EMI Records singles
Parlophone singles